Beton Fest is an international 3D street art festival held annually in Sarajevo, Bosnia and Herzegovina. It is held in July of every year and lasts for five days, bringing in international street artists from all over the world. It was established in 2012 by the arts association Progres in cooperation with the Academy of Fine Arts, Sarajevo. Apart from showcasing 3D street art, it also organizes the Beton Music Stage which holds concerts and open-air parties for the duration of the festival. It is the only 3D street art festival in Southeastern Europe  and has hosted many renowned street artists such as Vera Bugatti, Giovanna la Pietra, Tony Cuboliquido, Manuel Bastante  and others.

References

External links
 Official website

2012 establishments in Bosnia and Herzegovina
Recurring events established in 2012
July events
Tourist attractions in Sarajevo
Annual events in Bosnia and Herzegovina
Art festivals
Street art
Festivals in Sarajevo
Arts in Sarajevo